Hearne is an unincorporated hamlet in Redburn Rural Municipality No. 130, Saskatchewan, Canada. Located 34 km southwest of Rouleau,
Hearne is the birthplace of Canadian newspaper and magazine journalist Allan Fotheringham.

See also 
 List of communities in Saskatchewan
 Hamlets of Saskatchewan
 List of ghost towns in Canada
 Ghost towns in Saskatchewan

References 

Unincorporated communities in Saskatchewan
Ghost towns in Saskatchewan
Redburn No. 130, Saskatchewan
Division No. 6, Saskatchewan